TOBB Sport Hall is an indoor multi-purpose sport venue that is located in the TOBB University of Economics and Technology Söğütözü Campus, Ankara, Turkey. The hall, with a capacity for 2,000 spectators, was built in 2007. It is home to TED Ankara Kolejliler, which plays currently in the Turkish Basketball League.

References

Sports venues completed in 2007
Indoor arenas in Turkey
Basketball venues in Turkey
2007 establishments in Turkey